Best Film (Kvikmynd ársins or Bíómynd ársins in Icelandic) is the main category of Edda Award, and it has been given annually since 1999.

List of winners

External links 
 Edda Awards Official Website

Edda Awards
Awards for best film